Kaufman is a city in and the county seat of Kaufman County, Texas, United States. Its population was 6,797 at the 2020 census.

History
Kaufman was founded as "Kings Fort", named after Dr. William P. King, who established the fort in 1840 after purchasing  of land where the city is now located. The community was renamed "Kingsboro" after five years of growth. In 1852, Kingsboro was renamed "Kaufman" after the newly formed Kaufman County, which in turn was named after David S. Kaufman.

Kaufman was the first place that Bonnie Parker, of Bonnie and Clyde, was incarcerated.

Nearby Camp Kaufman was used as a German POW camp during World War II.

Geography
U.S. Route 175, a four-lane limited access highway, passes through the southwest side of the city, leading northwest  to Dallas and southeast  to Athens. Texas State Highway 34 passes through the south and east sides of the city, leading north  to Terrell and southwest  to Ennis. State Highway 243 leads east from Kaufman  to Canton.

Climate
The climate in this area is characterized by hot, humid summers and generally mild to cool winters.  According to the Köppen climate classification, Kaufman has a humid subtropical climate, Cfa on climate maps.

Demographics

As of the 2020 United States census, there were 6,797 people, 2,177 households, and 1,427 families residing in the city.

Sports
Kaufman was home to minor league baseball. The 1915 Kaufman Kings played as members of the Class D level Central Texas League before the league disbanded.

Education

Public schools
Kaufman and surrounding portions of Kaufman County are served by the Kaufman Independent School District.

Private schools

Honors Academy operates the Legacy Academy, a grades 6–12 charter school, in Kaufman.

In addition, Kaufman Christian School, a church-run school with classes from prekindergarten to 12th grade, also serves the area.

Colleges and universities
Trinity Valley Community College operates its Health Science Center in Kaufman. (The college offers other nonmedical general-education courses at other TVCC campuses.)

Notable people

 Ted Healy, comedian, actor and discoverer of The Three Stooges, was born in Kaufman in 1896
 Stuart Spitzer, surgeon in Kaufman and former member of the Texas House of Representatives
 Sonny Strait, voice actor
 Craig Birdsong, NFL Defensive Back for the Houston Oilers
 Claude Stroud, Actor known for Breakfast at Tiffany's (film), and multiple work's on TV series' such as Perry Mason
 Clarence Stroud Twin of Claude Stroud, Actor

See also
List of World War II prisoner-of-war camps in the United States

References

External links
 
 Official website
 Kaufman Chamber of Commerce
 

Dallas–Fort Worth metroplex
Cities in Texas
Cities in Kaufman County, Texas
County seats in Texas
U.S. Route 175